Stephanachne is a genus of Asian plants in the grass family.

 Species
 Stephanachne nigrescens Keng - Tibet, Gansu, Qinghai, Shaanxi, Sichuan
 Stephanachne pappophorea (Hack.) Keng - Tajikistan, Tibet, Xinjiang, Mongolia, Gansu, Inner Mongolia, Qinghai

References

Pooideae
Poaceae genera